The Allied Arts Building is a historic high-rise building located at 725 Church Street in Lynchburg, Virginia. It is currently being remodeled for apartments.

Construction of the building began in 1929 and was completed in 1931, and it was designed by Stanhope S. Johnson and Addison Staples. The 17-story,  by  building was the tallest building in Lynchburg until completion of the Bank of the James Building was complete. It is steel framed and faced in yellow brick and greenstone in Art Deco style. Its outer shape and design is very similar to that of the Central National Bank in Richmond, Virginia.

It was listed on the National Register of Historic Places in 1985. It is located in the Court House Hill-Downtown Historic District.

See also
Central National Bank (Richmond, Virginia)

References

External links

 Skyscraperpage.com website
 Allied Arts Building, Eighth & Church Streets, Lynchburg, VA: 2 photos, 1 data page, and 1 photo caption page, at Historic American Buildings Survey

Historic American Buildings Survey in Virginia
Commercial buildings on the National Register of Historic Places in Virginia
Art Deco architecture in Virginia
Buildings and structures in Lynchburg, Virginia
National Register of Historic Places in Lynchburg, Virginia
Individually listed contributing properties to historic districts on the National Register in Virginia
Skyscraper office buildings in Virginia
Skyscrapers in Virginia
Office buildings completed in 1931